Ernest Dewey Albinson (March 9, 1898 in Minneapolis, Minnesota – 1971 in Jalisco, Mexico) was an American artist.

Early life and education
Albinson was the son of Swedish immigrant parents.

He studied at the Minneapolis School of Art in 1919, and at the Art Students League on a scholarship. He lived in France from 1923 to 1925.

Career 
He was the director and teacher at the Saint Paul School for Art, from 1926 to 1929. From 1929 to 1931, he lived in Italy, then moved to New York in 1932.

In 1933, he worked for the Public Works of Art Project, and in 1934 his painting Northern Minnesota Mine was exhibited at the Corcoran Gallery of Art, and toured the country. He was a project director for the Minnesota State Department of Education, from 1935 to 1937.  
He painted murals for post offices in Cloquet, Minnesota, and Marquette, Michigan.  
He was president of the Minnesota Art Association, from 1937 to 1938. From 1939 to 1941, he lived in Quebec. After returning to Minnesota, he moved to Stockton, New Jersey (to live near his friend, painter B.J.O. Nordfeldt), and finally to Nayarit, Jalisco, Mexico in 1953.

His work is in the Smithsonian American Art Museum,
San Diego Museum of Art, Minneapolis Institute of Art, University of Michigan Museum of Art, and Frederick R Weisman Art Museum.

References

External links

"Oral history interview with Dewey Albinson, 1965 Oct. 27", Archives of American Art
http://www.artnet.com/artists/dewey-albinson/
http://www.askart.com/AskART/artists/bulletin.aspx?searchtype=DISCUSS&artist=8107
https://web.archive.org/web/20110927135614/http://www.artsconnected.org/resource/28141/profile-dewey-albinson
https://www.flickr.com/photos/americanartmuseum/3267538932/
Painting of Dewey Albinson by Frances Cranmer Greenman

1898 births
1971 deaths
Artists from Minneapolis
Minneapolis College of Art and Design alumni
20th-century American painters
American male painters
Public Works of Art Project artists
Section of Painting and Sculpture artists
Painters from Minnesota
American muralists
American people of Swedish descent
Deaths in Mexico
20th-century American male artists